Tena Lukas (born 10 May 1995) is a Croatian tennis player.

She has won one doubles title on the WTA Challenger Tour as well as nine singles and five doubles titles on the ITF Circuit. On 12 September 2022, she reached her best singles ranking of world No. 200. On 18 July 2022, she peaked at No. 257 in the WTA doubles rankings.

Playing for Croatia Fed Cup team, Lukas has a win–loss record of 6–7 in Fed Cup competition.

Grand Slam singles performance timeline

Singles

WTA 125 tournament finals

Doubles: 1 (1 title)

ITF Circuit finals

Singles: 23 (9 titles, 14 runner–ups)

Doubles: 11 (5 titles, 6 runner–ups)

References

External links
 
 
 

1995 births
Living people
Croatian female tennis players
21st-century Croatian women